Michael Andrew McDermott (born November 22, 1961) is a former Republican member of the Maryland House of Delegates who represented district 38B from January 12, 2011 to January 14, 2015.

Background
McDermott was born in Hawthorne, California on November 22, 1961. He served in U.S. Army Reserve from 1980 to 1986. During that time he attended Wake Technical Community College and earned his A.A. (criminal justice) in 1981. He then attended the North Carolina Criminal Justice Academy, where he graduated with honors in 1982.

Before election to the House of Delegates he served as Mayor of Pocomoke City and worked in law enforcement.

In the legislature
McDermott was a member of the Judiciary Committee, from 2011-2015 and the criminal justice subcommittee. He served as the House Chair, Worcester County Delegation as well.

References

External links
Personal website

Republican Party members of the Maryland House of Delegates
Living people
1961 births
People from Pocomoke City, Maryland
People from Hawthorne, California
Mayors of places in Maryland
21st-century American politicians